Surinamese may refer to:

 Something of, from, or related to the country of Suriname
 A person from Suriname, or of Surinamese descent. For information about the Surinamese people, see:
 Surinamese people
 Demographics of Suriname
 Culture of Suriname
Sranan Tongo, the creole language spoken in Suriname as a lingua franca

Language and nationality disambiguation pages